Gold card may refer to:

Banking
 American Express Gold Card
 A type of credit card

Science and Technology
 A CPU upgrade card made by Miracle Systems in the 1980s and 90s
 An SD memory card for Android (operating system) based smartphones

Other
 An annual travel card for the British railway network
 A type of card in the game Myths and legends
 Gold pass, a privilege for Australia politicians, cancelled by Malcolm Turnbull; see Prime Minister of Australia
 A type of Nol Card on the Dubai Metro

See also
Black card (disambiguation)
Carte Blanche (credit card)
Palladium Card (now JPMorgan Reserve and Sapphire Reserve) and Sapphire Preferred credit cards from JPMorgan Chase
Platinum Card, an elite credit card